Aliabad (also Romanized as ‘Alīābād) is a village in Dasht-e Barm Rural District, Kuhmareh District, Kazerun County, Fars Province, Iran. At the 2006 census, its population was 114, in 25 families.

References 

Populated places in Kazerun County